Coleophora agenjoi is a moth of the family Coleophoridae that is endemic to Spain.

References

External links

agenjoi
Moths described in 1960
Moths of Europe
Endemic fauna of Spain